Jean-Paul Aron (27 May 1925 – 20 August 1988) was a French writer, philosopher and journalist. His most notable work is Les Modernes, which was published in 1984.

Life
Aron was born in Strasbourg. He was a close friend of Michel Foucault in the early 1950s, before a falling out over a lover. He was, like Foucault, an early person of renown in France to die of AIDS, and is widely credited for giving the disease a human face and challenging the public perception of the disease. During his lifetime, he published several historical works that examined middle-class social practices. He is buried at 6, rue du Repos in Paris.

Selected publications

Novels and plays
 La Retenue (novel) Grasset, 1962
 Point mort (novel) Grasset, 1964
 Le Bureau (play), 1970
 Fleurets mouchetés (play), 1970
 Les Voisines (play), 1980

Essays
Essai sur la sensibilité alimentaire à Paris au XIXe siècle, Armand Colin, 1967
Philosophie zoologique, by Jean-Baptiste de Lamarck (presentation by Jean-Paul Aron), 10/18, 1968
Essai d'épistémologie biologique, Christian Bourgois, 1969
Anthropologie du conscrit français (with Emmanuel Le Roy Ladurie and Paul Dumont), Mouton, 1972
Le Mangeur du XIXe siècle, Laffont, 1973, translate in English The art of eating in France: Manners and menus in the nineteenth century. Harper & Row, 1976.
Qu’est-ce que la culture française?, Denoël-Gonthier, 1975
Le Pénis et la démoralisation de l’Occident (with Roger Kempf), Grasset, 1978
Misérable et glorieuse, la femme du XIXe siècle (animated and presented by Jean-Paul Aron), Fayard, 1980

References

External links

Jean-Paul Aron's entry in the glbtq encyclopedia

1925 births
Writers from Strasbourg
1988 deaths
20th-century French non-fiction writers
20th-century French male writers
Academic staff of the School for Advanced Studies in the Social Sciences
AIDS-related deaths in France